Bursa was a   tanker that was built in 1941 as Empire Crest by Sir J Laing & Sons, Sunderland, United Kingdom. She was built for the Ministry of War Transport (MoWT). In 1946, she was sold into merchant service and renamed Bursa. She served until she was scrapped in 1961

Description
The ship was built in 1944 by Sir J Laing & Sons Ltd, Sunderland. Yard number 760, she was launched on 7 July and completed in September.

Her DWT was 5,168.

The ship was propelled by a triple expansion steam engine.

History
Empire Crest was built for the MoWT. She was placed under the management of Anglo-Saxon Petroleum Co Ltd. The Official Number 180143 was allocated. Her port of registry was Sunderland and the Code Letters GBKG were allocated. Empire Crest spent the war years sailing around the coast of the United Kingdom, with some voyages to France from December 1944.

In 1946, Empire Crest was sold to her managers and was renamed Bursa. In 1955, Bursa was sold to Shell Tankers Ltd and placed under the management of Shell Petroleum Co Ltd. She served until 1961 when she was scrapped at Sungei Perampuan, Singapore.

References

External links
Photo of Empire Crest

1944 ships
Ships built on the River Wear
Ministry of War Transport ships
Empire ships
World War II tankers
Steamships of the United Kingdom
Merchant ships of the United Kingdom